A Reckless Romeo is a 1917 American short silent comedy film directed by and starring Roscoe 'Fatty' Arbuckle.

Plot
A philandering husband's public flirtation with a beautiful girl—and the resulting brawl with the woman's boyfriend—are captured by a newsreel cameraman. When the husband takes his wife and her mother out to the movies, the footage is shown on-screen. The husband tries to flee the theater, only to be spotted and leaped upon by the woman's boyfriend, treating viewers to two simultaneous fights between the same two men, both on-screen and in the aisle.

Cast
 Roscoe 'Fatty' Arbuckle as Husband
 Al St. John as Rival
 Corinne Parquet as Wife
 Agnes Neilson as Mother-in-Law
 Alice Lake as Girl in Park
 Jimmy Bryant
 Joe Bordeaux as Newsreel director (uncredited)

Production
The film was released by the Comique Film Corporation when it and many other early film studios in America's first motion picture industry were based in Fort Lee, New Jersey, at the beginning of the 20th century. Some shots were done at Palisades Amusement Park.

The film was originally produced in New Jersey as one of Arbuckle's last Keystone pictures. Filmed between July and September 1916 and later sold to Paramount, it was released as a Comique film on May 21, 1917, after The Butcher Boy and before The Rough House.

Preservation status
Thought to have been lost, a print was discovered in 1998 in the Norwegian Film Archive in an unmarked canister with another lost Arbuckle short, The Cook (1918). The film archive at George Eastman House has a 35 mm positive print.

See also
 Fatty Arbuckle filmography
 List of rediscovered films

References

External links
 

1917 films
1917 comedy films
1917 short films
1910s rediscovered films
American black-and-white films
Silent American comedy films
American silent short films
Films directed by Roscoe Arbuckle
Films shot in Fort Lee, New Jersey
Films with screenplays by Roscoe Arbuckle
Rediscovered American films
1910s American films